Onésiphore Ernest Talbot (August 15, 1854 – May 6, 1934) was a Canadian politician.

Born in St-Arsène, Temiscouata County, Canada East, Talbot was educated at St. Michel and the Quebec Seminary. A farmer, he was a member of the Council of Agriculture in the Province of Quebec and was awarded Quebec's Ordre national du mérite agricole. He was a Lieutenant-Colonel with the 17th Regiment de Lévis and Bellechasse. He was elected to the House of Commons of Canada for Bellechasse in the 1896 federal election. A Liberal, he was re-elected in 1900, 1904, and 1908. He was defeated in 1911.

References
 The Canadian Parliament; biographical sketches and photo-engravures of the senators and members of the House of Commons of Canada. Being the tenth Parliament, elected November 3, 1904

External links
 

1854 births
1934 deaths
Liberal Party of Canada MPs
Members of the House of Commons of Canada from Quebec